Paulus Aemilius can refer to:

 Lucius Aemilius Paullus Macedonicus, Roman consul.
 Paulus Aemilius Veronensis (c. 1455 – 1529), Italian historian
 Paulus Aemilius (Hebrew scholar) (c. 1510 – 1575), Bavarian Hebrew teacher and bibliographer